The Tanzania National Archives (est. 1962) is the national archives of Tanzania. The headquarters are located in Dar es Salaam on Vijibweni Street in Upanga. Leaders have included J. R. Ede (circa 1960s).

See also 
 
 List of national archives
 Unesco Memory of the World Register – Africa

References

Bibliography

External links
 

Tanzania
History of Tanzania
Dar es Salaam
1962 establishments in Tanzania